Raja Baba (April 5, 1968 – October 9, 2002) was an American Thoroughbred racehorse who became the 1980 Champion sire in North America.

Background
Raja Baba was sired by Bold Ruler, the leading sire in North America eight times and a National Museum of Racing and Hall of Fame inductee. His dam was Missy Baba, a daughter of My Babu, a winner of the British Classic 2,000 Guineas Stakes in 1948 who became the influential sire of forty-seven stakes winners and a damsire sire of ninety-five winners.

Raja Baba was bred and raced by Michael G. Phipps, the son of Ogden Phipps.

Racing career
As a three-year-old, he won the Francis Scott Key Stakes at Bowie Race Course followed a week later by a division of the Delaware Valley Handicap at Garden State Park. At age four, Raja Baba won the Bold Ruler Purse at Delaware Park Racetrack and finished second in the Phoenix Handicap at Keeneland, the Japan Racing Association Handicap at Laurel Park, and the Garrison Handicap at Liberty Bell Park Racetrack.

Stud record
Near the end of his racing career, Raja Baba was sold to William S. Farish III who in turn sold a half interest to breeder, Warner L. Jones. He was syndicated in 1972 in a 36 share deal at $10,000 per share, a figure that his success as a stallion would see rise to a selling price of $205,000 per share on the open market by 1982. Retired from racing at the end of 1972, he was sent to stand at stud at Warner Jones' Hermitage Farm near Goshen, Kentucky. As a freshman stallion in 1976, Raja Baba was the leading juvenile sire in the United States
 and four years later both the leading juvenile sire and overall leading sire in the United States.

During his career at stud, Raja Baba sired sixty-two stakes winners and two Champions. In 1985, his daughter Summer Mood won the Sovereign Award as the Canadian Champion Sprint Horse of either sex. Another daughter, Sacahuista, won the 1987 Breeders' Cup Distaff and was voted the Eclipse Award as that year's American Champion Three-Year-Old Filly. Sacahuista was the dam of Hussonet who became a highly successful multiple Champion sire in Chile and who in 2002 earned the highest stud fee of any stallion ever to have stood in that country and Gran Zar Horse of the year and champion 3 year old in Mexico Triple crown winner.

Raja Baba's other successful offspring included Is It True, winner of the 1988 Breeders' Cup Juvenile, as well as Grade 1 winners Junius, Well Decorated and Royal Ski, the latter the damsire of the undefeated Japanese runner Agnes Tachyon who became the Leading sire in Japan in 2008.

At the end of the 1987 breeding season Raja Baba was pensioned. He was euthanized at Hermitage Farm in 2002 at age thirty-four due to complications from age related infirmities and was buried in its equine cemetery.

Pedigree

References

 Raja Baba's pedigree and partial racing stats

1968 racehorse births
2002 racehorse deaths
Racehorses bred in Kentucky
Racehorses trained in the United States
United States Champion Thoroughbred Sires
Phipps family
Thoroughbred family 3-l